The 1974 Jordanian  League (known as The Jordanian  League,   was the 24th season of Jordan League since its inception in 1944.  In the 1974 it was called (first division league).  Al-Faisaly won its 15th title.

Teams

Map

League table

Overview
Al-Faysali won the championship.

References
RSSSF

External links
 Jordan Football Association website

Jordanian Pro League seasons
Jordan
Jordan
football